"Fight Like a Brave" is the first and only single from American funk rock band Red Hot Chili Peppers' third album The Uplift Mofo Party Plan. The single also included a cover of the Jimi Hendrix song "Fire" as a B-side, which would later appear on The Abbey Road E.P. and Mother's Milk as a tribute to guitarist Hillel Slovak, who died in 1988.

Composition
Most of the song's lyrics revolve around Anthony Kiedis' addiction to heroin.  At the lowest point in Kiedis' addiction, Flea had kicked him out of the Chili Peppers with no intention of letting him back in unless he was proven sober.  After getting clean through various rehab programs, he called Flea to tell him of his success, and was accepted back in the band. On the plane ride home, Kiedis wrote this song about his struggles with drugs and his overcoming them.

The song is mostly an attempt to inspire other people like the rehab sessions were motivational for Kiedis to abandon the drugs. Kiedis described "Fight Like a Brave" as  "a metaphor for trying to encourage someone who feels as though they don't have a chance [as though] they're grovelling in the gutter of life." He also said the song expressed the band's discontentment with EMI, their label at the time.

The song is featured in the video game Tony Hawk's Pro Skater 3 as well as the 1987 movie Less than Zero.

A portion of the song's lyrics, "No one can tell you you've got to be afraid," was also used by Bradley Nowell in the Sublime song "All You Need".

Live performances 
Despite being a single, the song has only been performed 38 times and has not been performed live since 1992. It has, however, been teased several times since then.

Track listing
7" single (1987)
 "Fight Like a Brave"
 "Fire"

12" single (1987)
 "Fight Like a Brave" (Not Our Mix)
 "Fight Like a Brave" (Boner Beats Mix)
 "Fight Like a Brave" (Mofo Mix)
 "Fire"

12" picture disc/12" promo (1987)
 "Fight Like a Brave" (Mofo Mix)
 "Fight Like a Brave" (Knucklehead Mix)
 "Fire"

12" Japanese split promo/DJ copy (1987)
 "Fight Like a Brave" (album) by Red Hot Chili Peppers
 "Contradiction" (Heavy Mix) by Lions & Ghosts

References

Red Hot Chili Peppers songs
1987 singles
Songs written by Anthony Kiedis
Songs written by Flea (musician)
Songs written by Hillel Slovak
Songs written by Jack Irons
Song recordings produced by Michael Beinhorn
1987 songs